Violated! is a 1974 film directed by Albert Zugsmith.

References

External links
 

1974 films
American drama films
American black-and-white films
1974 animated films
1970s American animated films
1974 drama films
1970s English-language films
Films directed by Albert Zugsmith